Chongra Peak is a peak in the Himalaya range of Asia. Located in Gilgit–Baltistan, Pakistan,
it is one of the many subsidiary summits of the Nanga Parbat massif.

The peak lies just south of the Indus River, in Pakistan. Not far to the north is the western end of the Karakoram range.

Layout of the mountain 
From the article: Nanga Parbat

The core of Nanga Parbat is a long ridge trending southwest–northeast. The southwestern portion of this main ridge is known as the Mazeno Ridge, and has a number of subsidiary peaks. In the other direction, the main ridge starts as the East Ridge before turning northeast at Rakhiot Peak (7070m). The south/southeast side of the mountain is dominated by the Rupal Face, noted above. The north/northwest side of the mountain, leading to the Indus, is more complex. It is split into the Diamir (west) face and the Rakhiot (north) face by a long ridge. There are a number of subsidiary summits, including the North Peak (7816m) some 3 km north of the main summit. Chongra Peak itself is located at the far east end of the massif, directly north of the village of Tarashing and the upper Astore Valley.

See also 
 List of mountains in Pakistan
 Highest mountains of the world

References

External links 
 Northern Pakistan detailed placemarks in Google Earth

Mountains of Gilgit-Baltistan
Six-thousanders of the Himalayas